Thomas Wörle (born 11 February 1982) is a German former footballer who is the manager of SSV Ulm 1846.

He is the brother of former Bayern Munich striker Tanja Wörle and succeeded his father Günther Wörle as coach of the club's women's team.

Honours

Managerial honours
FC Bayern Munich Women
Bundesliga: Winner 2015, 2016
DFB-Pokal: Winner 2012
 Bundesliga Cup: Winner 2011

References

External links

1982 births
Living people
German footballers
Germany youth international footballers
German football managers
FC Bayern Munich non-playing staff
FC Augsburg players
TSV 1860 Munich II players
Kickers Offenbach players
SpVgg Greuther Fürth players
2. Bundesliga players
People from Günzburg (district)
Sportspeople from Swabia (Bavaria)
Association football midfielders
Footballers from Bavaria